Mycobacterium gordonae is a species of Mycobacterium named for Ruth E. Gordon.  It is a species of the phylum Actinomycetota (Gram-positive bacteria with high guanine and cytosine content, one of the dominant phyla of all bacteria), belonging to the genus Mycobacterium.

Description
Gram-positive, nonmotile and moderate to long acid-fast rods.
Commonly found in tap water and soil. Casual resident in human sputum and gastric lavage specimens.

Colony characteristics
Smooth, with yellow or orange scotochromogenic colonies.  Even though they are scotochromogenic pigment is intensified by growing in continuous light.

Physiology
Growth on Löwenstein-Jensen medium and Middlebrook 7H10 agar within 7 or more days at 37 °C (optimal 25 °C).
Does not grow in the presence of ethambutol (1 mg/L), isoniazid (10 mg/L) and sodium chloride (5%).
Some strains can grow using carbon monoxide as a carbon and energy source.

Differential characteristics
A commercial hybridisation assay (AccuProbe) to identify M. gordonae exists.
Intraspecies variability in 16S rDNA sequences

Pathogenesis
Rarely if ever implicated in disease processes even if patients are immunocompromised. Widely distributed in environment and usually a contaminant in laboratory specimens.
Biosafety level 2

Type strain
Strain ATCC 14470 = CCUG 21801 = CCUG 21811 = CIP 104529 = DSM 44160 = JCM 6382 = NCTC 10267.

References

Further reading

External links 
Type strain of Mycobacterium gordonae at BacDive -  the Bacterial Diversity Metadatabase

Acid-fast bacilli
gordonae
Bacteria described in 1962